Dundalk Photographic Society is an Irish camera club based in Dundalk, County Louth. The society achieved global acclaim in its thirtieth year in December 2008 by reaching the highest level ever for an Irish body in a major amateur competition when it took 11th place in an annual event run by the International Federation of Photographic Art (FIAP). Eleven photographers put forward twenty entries, including A Winter's Walk by David Martin, and Into the Mist by Denis Whelehan. In 2007, the society entered a competition in the United Arab Emirates, achieving sixth place in the world but this was not counted as the society was not a representative of the FIAP at the time.

In December 2010 Dundalk Photographic Society improved on its 2008 success by winning the 2010 FIAP Club World Cup - the ultimate goal of any amateur photographic organisation and a dream come through for its members. Dundalk Photographic Society saw off competition from 123 other photography clubs from around the world to claim the title. The five club members who contributed to the winning 2010 FIAP Club World Cup panel were Gabriel O'Shaughnessy, Tony McDonnell, David Martin, Brian Hopper & Ciaran deBhal. A group of approximately 15 members travelled to the FIAP headquarters in Paris, France to accept the FIAP World Cup Trophy on 12 February 2011, including veteran club members Denis Whelehan & Colm Kane. The full Dundalk Photographic Society 2010 FIAP Club World Cup winning panel can be found here .

In November 2009 Dundalk Photographic Society published a limited edition book entitled "Dundalk Photographic Society, Celebrating 30 Years: The Art of Photography". The book featured over 200 images from members of the club and contained a foreword from President Mary McAleese.

References

External links 
 Official Site (www.dundalkphoto.com)
 General Flickr Page
 Twitter Page
 Facebook Page

Irish photography organisations
Clubs and societies in Ireland